is the 40th single release by the Japanese pop girl group Morning Musume. It was released on August 12, 2009 in four versions: regular edition, a 40th single commemorative, and two limited edition versions. The limited editions each contain a different DVD with one of the PVs on it — as well as these, "Nanchatte Ren'ai (Close-up Ver. White)" and "Making of" were included on the Eizō The Morning Musume 4: Single M Clips DVD.

On the August 14, 2009 broadcast of Music Station, original Morning Musume members Yuko Nakazawa, Kaori Iida, Mari Yaguchi, Rika Ishikawa, Hitomi Yoshizawa, Nozomi Tsuji and Asami Konno did a special performance as backing dancers in a collaboration with the current members.

Contents 
Being the group's 40th single, "Nanchatte Ren'ai" has a special "40th Anniversary" commemorative release which contains the coupling track "Subete wa Ai no Chikara", a different track than the other releases. The album cover of the commemorative CD features Morning Musume in front of a white background, instead of a red background as featured in the other releases. The regular edition, Limited A and Limited B releases each contain the coupling track "Aki Urara" and each sport different covers. Each release contains the instrumental track of "Nanchatte Ren'ai".

The two limited edition releases of the single both come with a DVD containing alternate versions of the music video for "Nanchatte Ren'ai". The Limited A DVD contains "Nanchatte Ren'ai (Dance Shot Ver.)", a music video consisting completely of Morning Musume performing the dance created for the single. The Limited B DVD contains "Nanchatte Ren'ai (Close-up Ver. Black)", a video consisting completely of solo shots of the members.

Track listing 
All tracks are written and composed by Tsunku and arranged by Kaoru Okubo.

Regular and limited edition CDs 
 
 
 "Nanchatte Ren'ai" (Instrumental)

40th Anniversary CD 
 "Nanchatte Ren'ai"
 
 "Nanchatte Ren'ai" (Instrumental)

Limited A DVD 
 "Nanchatte Ren'ai" (Dance Shot Ver.)

Limited B DVD 
 "Nanchatte Ren'ai" (Close-up Ver. Black)

Featured lineup 
 5th generation: Ai Takahashi, Risa Niigaki
 6th generation: Eri Kamei, Sayumi Michishige, Reina Tanaka
 7th generation: Koharu Kusumi
 8th generation: Aika Mitsui, Junjun, Linlin

Nanchatte Ren'ai Vocalists

Main Vocal : Ai Takahashi, Reina Tanaka

Center Vocal : Risa Niigaki, Eri Kamei, Sayumi Michishige, Koharu Kusumi

Minor Vocal : Aika Mitsui, Junjun, Linlin

Chart positions

References

External links 
 "Nanchatte Ren'ai" entry on the Hello! Project official website 
"Nanchatte Ren'ai" entry at the official Up-Front Works discography 

2009 singles
Morning Musume songs
Song recordings produced by Tsunku
Songs written by Tsunku
Zetima Records singles
2009 songs